Rzeplin  (Riplyn) is a village in the administrative district of Gmina Pruchnik, within Jarosław County, Subcarpathian Voivodeship, in south-eastern Poland.

The village has a population of 120.

References

Rzeplin